The Ethnological Museum of Chittagong is the only ethnological museum in Bangladesh. Located in Agrabad, Chittagong, it contains displays featuring the history of Bangladesh's tribal people.

History 

The museum was established in 1965 and opened to the public in 1974. Two rooms were added to the museum during 1985–1995. In 1996, a gallery with folk articles of Bengali-speaking people was added.

References

External links 

 Lonely Planet review for Ethnological Museum
 Ethnological Museum - Virtual Bangladesh: Chittagong
 Ethnological Museum on Wikimapia
 Ethnological Museum, Chittagong by Muhammad Nizamul Haque

Museums established in 1965
Agrabad
Ethnographic museums in Asia
Museums in Chittagong
Tourist attractions in Chittagong Division